"Itsy Bitsy Spider" is a nursery rhyme.

Itsy Bitsy Spider may also refer to:

Itsy Bitsy Spider (film), a 1992 animated short
Itsy Bitsy Spider (TV series), an animated series based on the film
 "Itsy Bitsy Spider", a short story by James Patrick Kelly

Music
"Itzy Bitzy Spider" (Aqua song), a 1995 song by Joyspeed (later known as Aqua)
"Itsy Bitsy Spider" (EliZe song)
"Itsy Bitsy Spider", song sampled on and recorded alongside "Coming Around Again"

See also
Itsy Bitsy, a 2019 horror film